Paul Anthony Dy Artadi (born May 5, 1981) is a Filipino politician, basketball coach, and former professional player. On his eleven-year career in the Philippine Basketball Association (PBA), he played the point guard position and was a three-time PBA All-Star. In the collegiate level, he played for the University of the East (UE) and became an assistant coach for the team after retiring from the professional game. He has been serving as a city councilor of San Juan, Metro Manila since 2016.

Early life and collegiate career

Artadi was born in the University of Santo Tomas Hospital in Manila but grew up in the outskirts of San Juan, Metro Manila, playing pick-up games with much taller and much stronger playground legends.

He played collegiate basketball at the University of the East. During his stint with the Red Warriors in the UAAP, he became an instant hardcourt and campus icon as he teamed up with the highly touted scoring ace James Yap. His partnership with Yap produced several final four appearances, hundreds of three-point shots converted courtesy of Yap, hundreds of assists courtesy of Artadi, and millions of fans who became followers of perhaps the most celebrated back court tandem in the history of the Philippine's premier collegiate basketball league.

Professional career

Artadi was the drafted by Purefoods TJ Hotdogs in the second round of the 2004 PBA draft, where he reunited with former college teammate James Yap to form the Kid Lightning-Boy Thunder backcourt. As backup point guard to Roger Yap, he managed to help Purefoods capture the championship in the 2006 PBA Philippine Cup.

During the 2007 off-season, he demanded to be released by Purefoods because he felt he was given limited playing time by the coaching staff. He finally got his wish, and was traded to the Barangay Ginebra Kings via a three-team trade. While with Ginebra, he had his best career output in the PBA while playing with the team's ace skipper Jayjay Helterbrand. He also won another championship with the Gin Kings during the 2008 PBA Fiesta Conference.

In 2009, he was traded back to his former team, the Purefoods Tender Juicy Giants. In his second stint with the squad, he helped the team win the 2009–10 PBA Philippine Cup Finals.

When coach Ryan Gregorio left Purefoods in 2010, he was traded to the San Miguel Beermen for Jonas Villanueva.

In March 2011, he was traded to Air21 Express (later renamed as Barako Bull Energy) along with Dondon Hontiveros, Dorian Peña and Danny Seigle in exchange for Nonoy Baclao, Rabeh Al-Hussaini and Rey Guevarra, top three picks of the 2010 PBA draft.

In February 2012, he was shipped to the Meralco Bolts for Chico Lanete where he was reunited with his former coach Ryan Gregorio.

After the 2013–14 PBA season ended, he was left off the "Protect 12" list by Meralco.  He was eventually picked by expansion team Blackwater Elite during the 2014 PBA Expansion Draft.

Political career 
On October 13, 2015, Artadi announced his retirement from professional basketball to shift his focus to politics. He ran as city councilor of San Juan in the 2016 local elections under the ticket of Vice Mayor Francis Zamora, who ran for mayor. He was proclaimed winner as San Juan city councilor for the 1st district. In 2019, he successfully defended his seat city council seat.

Personal life
Aside from being a professional basketball player, Artadi has an online business, which he named "Pimp Kicks", selling basketball shoes online through his Facebook and Instagram accounts.

References

1981 births
Living people
Barako Bull Energy players
Barangay Ginebra San Miguel players
Basketball players from Metro Manila
Blackwater Bossing players
Filipino city and municipal councilors
Filipino men's basketball players
Filipino sportsperson-politicians
Magnolia Hotshots players
Meralco Bolts players
People from San Juan, Metro Manila
Philippine Basketball Association All-Stars
Point guards
San Miguel Beermen players
Tagalog people
UE Red Warriors basketball players
Magnolia Hotshots draft picks